Conus diminutus is a species of sea snail, a marine gastropod mollusk in the family Conidae, the cone snails and their allies.

Like all species within the genus Conus, these snails are predatory and venomous. They are capable of "stinging" humans, therefore live ones should be handled carefully or not at all.

Description
The size of the shell varies between 9 mm and 22 mm.

Distribution
This species occurs in the Atlantic Ocean along the west coast of the island Boa Vista, Cape Verde.

References

 Trovão, H. and Rolán, E. 1986. Description of a new species for the genus Conus (Mollusca: Gastropoda) from the Cape Verde Islands. Publicações Ocasionais da Sociedade Portuguesa de Malacologia 7:9–15, 2 figs.
  Puillandre N., Duda T.F., Meyer C., Olivera B.M. & Bouchet P. (2015). One, four or 100 genera? A new classification of the cone snails. Journal of Molluscan Studies. 81: 1–23

External links
 The Conus Biodiversity website
 Cone Shells – Knights of the Sea
 

diminutus
Gastropods of Cape Verde
Endemic fauna of Cape Verde
Gastropods described in 1986